PT Indonusa Telemedia, branded as Transvision is a subscription-based direct broadcast satellite provider service for Indonesia. It is Trans Media, a subsidiary of CT Corp.

Transvision's slogan is Broadcasting at The Edge of Technology.

Early history 
PT Indonusa Telemedia was established on May 7, 1997, with the brand name TelkomVision. They began operations in 1999 and started as a company consisting of several shareholders:   	 
 PT Telekomunikasi Indonesia Tbk (Telkom)
 PT Telekomindo Primabhakti (part of Rajawali Corpora, which was led by Peter Sondakh, which also own a stake in PT Excelcomindo Pratama)
 PT Rajawali Citra Televisi Indonesia (RCTI)
 PT Datakom Asia

By 2003, Telkom became its principal shareholder by holding 98.75% share of TelkomVision, while the rest (1.25%) is owned by Datakom, which was owned by Peter F. Gontha, Bambang Trihatmodjo, Anthoni Salim cs, which also own a stake in SCTV, Cipta Aneka Selaras, Indovision and Kabelvision.

In 2014, TelkomVision officially rebranded as Transvision due to TelkomVision shareholders only 20% and now owned by Trans Media which became its principal shareholder by holding 80%. Now Transvision is fully owned by joint venture between Telkom Group and Trans Media.

Cable TV
Transvision coverage area for analog cable TV is limited to a number of cities in Indonesia, such as Jakarta, Bandung, Semarang, and Surabaya. It has also a digital cable service that covers Bandung, Jakarta, and Surabaya. Now replaced by IndiHome which still owned by Telkom Indonesia, as of 2021.

Satellite TV
Transvision's satellite service covers 38 distributor areas in Indonesia. Transvision is using the Measat 3B satellite (Ku-band) to provide  High Definition TV.

Subscribers
At April 2011, TelkomVision has 200,000 subscribers and was planned be boosted up to 500,000 at end of the year using security and media technology software, Irdeto's Conditional Access System. The lowest Hit Family package costs Rp.55,000 ($6.4) per month, but Transvision would soon release a cheaper product to introduce pay TV broadcasts.

Footnotes

References

External links
  
 Channel and transponder list

Mass media companies established in 1997
1997 establishments in Indonesia
2014 establishments in Indonesia
Direct broadcast satellite services
Cable television companies
Television companies of Indonesia
Trans Media
Telkom Indonesia
NBCUniversal